Marco Grassi (born 8 August 1968) is a Swiss former professional footballer, who played as a centre forward. He was part of the Switzerland national team squads at the 1994 World Cup and at the UEFA Euro 1996.

Club career
Grassi was born in Chiasso.

During his career, spent entirely in Switzerland and France, Grassi represented SC Zug, FC Chiasso, FC Zürich, Servette FC, Stade Rennais, AS Monaco, FC Sion, AS Cannes, Olympique Lyonnais and OGC Nice. At Monaco he was part of the side that won the 1996-97 Ligue 1 title, making 12 appearances in the process.

As an expatriate, his best years were with Rennes, scoring 15 and 11 times respectively, as the club had just returned to the first division in his first year, proceeding to qualify for the UEFA Intertoto Cup in the second.

Grassi retired in 2000, at nearly 32, with French second division's Nice. Six years later, he became president of his very first club, hometown Chiasso.

International career
For Switzerland, Grassi gained 31 international caps scoring three goals, his debut coming in 1993; always as a backup, he participated at 1994 FIFA World Cup (one match) and UEFA Euro 1996 (two).

References

External links

1968 births
Living people
Swiss-Italian people
Swiss men's footballers
Association football forwards
Switzerland international footballers
1994 FIFA World Cup players
UEFA Euro 1996 players
Swiss Super League players
FC Chiasso players
FC Zürich players
Servette FC players
FC Sion players
Ligue 1 players
Ligue 2 players
Stade Rennais F.C. players
AS Monaco FC players
AS Cannes players
Olympique Lyonnais players
OGC Nice players
Swiss expatriate footballers
Swiss expatriate sportspeople in France
Expatriate footballers in France
Swiss expatriate sportspeople in Monaco
Expatriate footballers in Monaco